The Irish military diaspora refers to the many people of either Irish birth or extraction (see Irish diaspora) who have served in overseas military forces, regardless of rank, duration of service, or success.

Many overseas military units were primarily made up of Irishmen (or members of the Irish military diaspora) and had the word 'Irish', an Irish place name or an Irish person in the unit's name. 'Irish' named military units took part in numerous conflicts throughout world history. The first military unit of this kind was in the Spanish Netherlands during the Eighty Years' War between Spain and the Dutch. A notable example is that of Owen Roe O'Neill.

Australia and New Zealand
The British colonies of Australia and New Zealand suffered a series of 'war scares' during the 19th century from perceived threats from France and Russia. In 1870, when the last British troops left, defence became the responsibility of locally raised colonial forces.

New Zealand
Among the British fencibles (British army soldiers given land) in 1847 many of them were Irishmen. The first Irish unit formed was in New Zealand - the Christchurch Royal Irish Rifle Volunteers were gazetted on 18 November 1868, re-designated No. 2 (Royal Irish) Company Christchurch R.V. on 4 April 1871, and then disbanded on 11 August 1874.

On 29 April 1885, a meeting was held in Christchurch, New Zealand and 95 members of the Irish community applied to form an Irish volunteer corps. That was accepted on 30 April 1885 as the Canterbury Irish Rifle Volunteers.

On 1 June 1892, they were amalgamated with the Sydenham R.V. to form the Christchurch City R.V., gazetted 22 July 1892.

New Zealand's Dunedin Irish R.V. were formed on 7 May 1885, when 189 men offered their services. The Dunedin Irish R.V. became part of the 1st Battalion Otago R.V. on 25 January 1886 and were disbanded on 13 September 1893.

One other Irish Corps was to be formed in the South Island of New Zealand, the Southland Irish R.V., were formed at Invercargill and accepted 10 June 1885 as an Honorary Corps. On 7 August 1885, it applied to be formed into a Garrison Corps and then disbanded on 9 July 1886.

Another N.Z. Irish corps was proposed during a 'war scare' in 1885, the Temuka Irish Rifles, on 13 June 1885, but the proposal was abandoned when the government deemed it improbable that hostilities would ensue.

Another Irish corps was proposed on 3 April 1887 and was accepted on 24 June as the Auckland Royal Irish R. V. On 13 August 1887, they were posted to the 3rd Battalion Auckland R.V. When inspected on 6 October 1889, they had a total strength of 93 officers and men and they were disbanded on 5 March 1892.

The last Irish Corps to be formed in New Zealand was the Irish R.V. (Wanganui), accepted 22 October 1901. They were attached to the 2nd Battalion Wellington (West Coast) R.V. and 'J' Company, formed 16 April 1902, becoming 'I' Company on 1 November 1904.

The N.Z. Defence Act of 1911 saw an end to the volunteer system, the Wanganui Irish (by then 'H' Company) were absorbed into the new territorial system when the 2nd Battalion Wellington (West Coast) R.V. were re-designated, 7th Regiment (Wellington West Coast Rifles) on 17 March 1911.

An Irish Caubeen was worn by the Nelson, Marlborough, and West Coast Regiment, which came about after a regimental alliance with the Royal Irish Fusiliers, which took place on 23 September 1949. The blue caubeen and green hackle of the Royal Irish Fusiliers were formally presented to the NMWC Regiment at a Barrosa Day parade in 1961 but may have been worn on special anniversaries and parades before that. On 24 January 1964, the Ist Battalion Nelson, Marlborough, and West Coast Regiment amalgamated into the 2nd Battalion (Canterbury, Nelson, Marlborough, West Coast) Royal New Zealand Infantry Regiment. N.Z. Army Headquarters ruled that only "A" and "B" Companies of the new regiment were to wear the caubeen and hackle on dates significant to the regiment. That was found to be unworkable and so the caubeen and hackle were not worn until 1968 when the ruling was changed. Only officers and warrant officers seem to have worn the caubeen during formal parades, and the RNZIR cedar green beret was worn for everyday use. By the early 1990s. all ranks were wearing the caubeen and hackle. On the formation of the Royal Irish Rangers in 1969, the green caubeen of the Irish Rangers was adopted by the New Zealanders. The 2RNZIR discontinued wearing the caubeen in the 1990s due to financial constraints, and it was replaced by the cedar green beret. In November 1998, the NZ mounted rifles "lemon-squeezer" hat was introduced army-wide and was worn for formal parades, while the beret was worn for everyday use. In 1999, the rifle green beret was adopted for the New Zealand army and was phased-in in late 2002. The 2nd (Canterbury, Nelson, Marlborough, West Coast) Battalion Group, as the unit was known then, wore the green hackle on the left side of the mounted rifle hat. That was to signify the continued association with the Royal Irish Regiment.

Australia (pre-Federation)

Queensland
An offer to form an Irish Corps in the British colony of Queensland, Australia, had been rejected in 1862.

Eighteen years after the formation of the first Irish Corps in New Zealand, a Queensland Irish Volunteer Corps were proposed on 18 February 1887 and gazetted on 24 February 1887 as 'A' Company Queensland Irish Rifle Corps.

Established at Peel Street, South Brisbane with three officers and 100 other ranks, 'B' and 'C' companies quickly followed, formed on 11 March 1887 at Valley, North Brisbane and on 22 March 1887 at Petrie Terrace, West Brisbane.

'D' Company was formed at Gympie on 14 November 1888 with an establishment of three officers and 90 other ranks. The application to form this unit had been submitted on 27 May 1887. The application to form a company at Ipswich was submitted on 26 August 1889. They were gazetted on 4 September 1889 as 'E' Company and had a strength of three officers and 90 other ranks.

Gazetted the same day were 'F' Company established at Woolloongabba, East Brisbane, with three officers and 90 other ranks.

The final company raised was 'G' Company at Maryborough and again with three officers and 90 other ranks, on 4 December 1889.

An application in March 1887, signed by over 100 men willing to form an Irish Corps at Rockhampton came to nothing.

'G' Company at Maryborough was the first to disband on 6 August 1891, followed by 'D' Company at Gympie on 7 November 1894.

In a re-organisation during 1896, the Queensland Irish Volunteer Corps were designated 3rd (Queensland Irish) Battalion, Regiment of Queensland Rifles and 'A', 'B', 'C', 'E' and 'F' companies became 'I' ,'J', 'K', 'M', and 'N' companies. On 30 July 1897, 'I', 'K', and 'M' Companies were disbanded; 'L' and 'N' companies were disbanded by August the following year, and this brought to an end the Volunteer Corps in Queensland.

New South Wales
In November 1895, a meeting was held in Sydney Town Hall when it was decided to form an Irish Rifle Corps.

These companies were established and gazetted on 5 March 1896, as the New South Wales Irish Rifles. They were grouped together with St George Rifles and the Scottish Rifles to form an administrative regiment, designated the 5th (Union Volunteer) New South Wales Infantry Regiment on 20 June 1896. Another Irish company was formed in Sydney in 1998.
 
http://www.planetfigure.com/threads/australia-nsw-irish-rifle-regiment-1900.79431/

NSW Irish Rifles – belt-buckle

http://www.diggerhistory.info/pages-conflicts-periods/other/irish_rifle.htm

On 1 July 1899, these national companies split to form their own distinct regiments, and the Irish were re-designated as the 8th Union Volunteer Infantry Regiment (Irish Rifles).

Badges of the 8th Union Volunteers Infantry Regiment (Irish Rifles)
 
https://harrowercollection.com.au/33rd-infantry-regiment/

For administrative purposes, two non-Irish companies from the Illawarra district (one at Kogarah and one at Bulli) were attached.

A further Irish Company was formed at Newcastle, the men being sworn in during June 1900.

Twenty-three men of the 8th (Irish Rifles) fought in the Boer War.

The 8th Union Volunteers Infantry Regiment (Irish Rifles) was re-designated NSW Irish Rifle Regiment (Volunteers) in 1903, and then became the 1st Battalion NSW Irish Rifle Regiment in 1908.
 
A major re-organisation in 1912 saw the name change to 33rd Infantry Regiment and, in yet another re-organisation in 1918, changed to the 55th Battalion.

In 1927 the old NSW Irish Rifles title was revived. The 'Irish connection' finally came to an end in 1930, when the regiment was re-designated as the NSW Rifle Regiment.

NSW Irish Rifles
('Vice Regal' cigarette-card)

https://sites.google.com/site/irishregimentsoftheempire/australia-and-new-zealand

New South Wales Irish Rifles - hat badge variations

https://sites.google.com/site/irishregimentsoftheempire/australia-and-new-

South Australia
The South Australian Register, dated 13 February 1900, carried the following public notice: "A meeting of all interested in the formation of an Irish Rifle Corps will be held on Tuesday 20 February at 8pm in the town hall."

Afterwards 157 names of volunteers were taken, and after selection, were to become 'F' (Irish) Company, 1st Battalion Adelaide Rifles. At the formation of the Irish Company, it was suggested that a green uniform be worn, but no distinctive uniform was adopted. although a shamrock worked from black braid was worn on the uniform sleeves, and hand-engraved brass harp collar badges were worn. They were worn until January 1910, when the company was ordered to discontinue wearing them, which they did under protest. That was done to secure uniformity of dress with the other companies in the 10th AIR. A green stripe an inch wide was also approved to be worn on the trouser seams, but was later disallowed.

Victoria
Attempts had been made to form other Irish Corps. A five hundred strong Irish Australian Volunteer Corps was proposed in Melbourne Victoria in April 1885. A number of meetings were held at St. Patrick's Cathedral Hall.

Australia (post-Federation)
With the formation of the Australian Commonwealth military forces in 1903, the Adelaide Rifles became part of the newly formed 10th Australian Infantry Regiment. That had been the last Irish unit to be formed in Australia.

Steps were also taken in May 1901 and May 1910, to form an Irish Australian Regiment in Melbourne, and again in 1941. An Irish Volunteer Corps was proposed at a meeting held in the dining rooms of the Shamrock Hotel, in Perth Western Australia on 18 April 1900. Another Irish corps was proposed in Perth in 1904. An Irish regiment was suggested at Bendigo Victoria in April 1906, and a company of Irish Rifles was considered at Broken Hill NSW in April 1910. An Irish corps was also proposed in Queensland, as part of the 9th Australian Infantry Regiment (Moreton) in 1906. Committees were often appointed, but the corps were never formed.

The 4th Battalion, Royal Australian Regiment (4 RAR); an infantry battalion formed on 1 February 1964, and renamed the 2nd Commando Regiment on 19 June 2009. 4 R.A.R. is affiliated with Britain's 4th Regiment of Foot Guards (The Irish Guards). The 4 R.A.R. regimental band use the same uniform as the Pipes and Drums of the Irish Guards. The 4 R.A.R. battalion subsequently served in Malaysia as part of the Far East Strategic Reserve from August 1965 to September 1967, and seeing active service in Borneo against the Indonesian army during the Indonesia-Malaysia confrontation. The battalion began its first 12-month tour of Vietnam on 1 June 1968, returning to Vietnam for its second tour in May 1971. From 1990 to 1993 many individual soldiers from the battalion served with the United Nations in Cambodia. In 1993, soldiers from the battalion were detached for operational service in Somalia. In May 1993, the battalion deployed troops to Cambodia. In 1994, the battalion deployed Rwanda. In 1996, a decision was made to convert 4 RAR to a special forces unit. On 1 February 1997, was renamed to 4 RAR (Commando). The unit conducted operations in East Timor and Iraq, and later lost soldiers killed-in-action during the war in Afghanistan.

2/4 RAR Irish Pipes and Drums https://24rarassociation.com/?page_id=1076   (see image 66)

Austria and Austria-Hungary
The Habsburgs were the principal employers of Irish soldiers in Central Europe. The multinational nature of the empire meant that gifted foreigners were always welcome and had opportunities not available in other Eastern and Central European countries. By one estimation, over 100 Irishmen were field marshals, generals, or admirals in the Austrian Army, with a corresponding number of men holding commissions in the lower ranks. The first Irishman of note to serve the Habsburgs was Colonel Richard Walsh of Carrickmines, Dublin, who was mortally wounded at the Battle of Lützen. His son Oliver became a Major-General. In all, eleven members of this family were field marshals or generals, the most notable being George Olivier, count of Wallis.

Many Irishmen were Inhaber and held rank as regimental colonels. Jacob Butler is the first of these. A Walter Butler was an Inhaber of a dragoon regiment and received praise for his role in the defence of Frankfurt an der Oder. Butler was responsible for the assassination of the Bohemian general Albrecht von Wallenstein, who was in the process of defecting to the Swedes.
Another Irishman to serve as field marshal was Francis Taaffe, 3rd Earl of Carlingford. While attending the Jesuit college at Olomouc, he came to know Charles V, Duke of Lorraine, and this benefited his career greatly. He played a prominent role in saving Vienna in 1683 and in the subsequent conflict with the Turks. He later became a member of the Order of the Golden Fleece and served Charles V as his prime minister.

Baron Dermot Kavanagh († 1739) of Ballyane, County Wexford, served from his youth in the Imperial Army and took part in campaigns in Hungary, Italy and Flanders. At the imperial and royal court of Vienna he held the office of Kämmerer. In 1723 he bought the manor of Hauskirchen in Lower Austria from Prince Joseph von Liechtenstein. From 1727 to 1734 he commanded the Czech Dragoon Regiment No. 7 while holding the rank of colonel. In 1734 he was promoted to Generalfeldwachtmeister and the following year Kavanagh rose to the rank of lieutenant field marshal. He died in 1739 of wounds received during the siege of Belgrade. Kavanagh and his wife Felicitas are commemorated by a monument with an inscription in the parish church of St Lawrence at Hauskirchen, which names him in Latin as Dermitius Freiherr von Kavanagh.

Maximilian Ulysses Browne was of the first generation born in Austria but was from a prominent Limerick family. Through his mother, he was descended from the FitzGeralds, Earls of Desmond. Browne was a major-general by the age of 30. He rose to the rank of Generalfeldmarschall and died leading his men into battle during the Battle of Prague. Browne was a kinsman and mentor to Franz Moritz von Lacy (son of Peter Lacy) who rose to be president of the Hofkriegsrat from 1766 to 1774. Other famous Irish-Austrian generals included William O'Kelly from Aughrim in Co. Galway; John Sigismund Maguire of Co. Kerry, who captured Dresden in 1758 and successfully defended it against Frederick the Great, who mentioned him on a number of occasions; and General Karl O'Donnell, was known for his exceptional conduct at the Battle of Torgau. Meanwhile, Colonel Hume Caldwell of Co. Fermanagh was noted for his conduct at Breslau and Olmütz, where he perished. Unusually, Caldwell was of Protestant origin. Field Marshal Laval Nugent von Westmeath was prominent during the Napoleonic Wars and was most noted for his role in the capture of Rome in 1815. In recognition of this, Pope Pius VI made him a prince in 1816. There were no Irish regiments in the Austrian Army with influence confined to nobility serving as officers.

 Major Peter Martyn
 Franz Moritz Graf von Lacy
 Andreas Graf O'Reilly von Ballinlough
 Maximilian Ulysses Graf von Browne 
 Laval Graf Nugent von Westmeath
 Maximilian Graf O'Donnell von Tyrconnell
 Gottfried Freiherr von Banfield
 General Thomas Brady
 Captain Art O' Laoghaire

Great Britain

A significant number of Irish people, of all backgrounds, have served in the forces of the British Crown over the centuries. By the end of the 18th century and the beginning of the 19th century, well over one-third of the military forces of the British Army consisted of Irishmen and Anglo-Irish, because of:-

 the Kingdom of Ireland electing, from the Crown of Ireland Act 1542, to be in a personal union with:
 House of Tudor 
 from the 1603 Union of the Crowns, with the House of Stuart, and from 1707 the Stuart Kingdom of Great Britain
 from 1714 the House of Hanover
 from Irish House of Commons approving the acts of Union 1800, through the partitioning Government of Ireland Act 1920, and 1921 Anglo-Irish Treaty, Ireland was a constituent nation of the United Kingdom of Great Britain and Ireland, with the North continuing as part of the United Kingdom of Great Britain and Northern Ireland.
 the traditions of the nobility and landed gentry, which caused them to prefer military service to a career in trade (see: Noblesse oblige)
 economic necessity
 ambition
 family tradition

Irishmen and Anglo-Irish with notable or outstanding overseas careers included:-

 Major-General John Ardagh 
 Admiral Matthew Aylmer, 1st Baron Aylmer
 Rear Admiral Francis Beaufort
 William Blakeney, 1st Baron Blakeney
 Marshal of the Royal Air Force Sir Dermot Boyle
 Lieutenant-General Sir Edward Bulfin
 Lieutenant-General Sir William Butler
 Admiral of the Fleet Sir George Callaghan
 Guy Carleton, 1st Baron Dorchester
 Major General Sir George Colley
 Lieutenant-General Sir Eyre Coote
 Lieutenant-general Alan Cunningham
 Andrew Cunningham, 1st Viscount Cunningham of Hyndhope
 Field Marshal Sir John Dill
 Major-General Beauchamp Doran
 Eric Dorman-Smith
 Major-General Lord Dugan
 Paddy Finucane
 Air Chief Marshal Sir Francis Fogarty
 Field Marshal Viscount Gough
 Rear-Admiral James Macnamara
 Walter Guinness, 1st Baron Moyne
 Major General Sir Charles Gwynn
 Francis Rawdon-Hastings, 1st Marquess of Hastings
 Tom F. Hazell
 Major General Sir William Hickie
 Sir William Johnson, 1st Baronet
 General Sir Garrett O'Moore Creagh VC
 Brigadier General Richard Kane
 Lieutenant-General Sir Thomas Kelly-Kenny
 Field Marshal Lord Kitchener
 Major General Louis Lipsett
 Lieutenant General Henry Lyster VC
 General Sir Bryan Mahon
 Paddy Mayne
 George McElroy
 Lieutenant General Sir Charles MacMorrough Kavanagh
 Field marshal Richard Molesworth, 3rd Viscount Molesworth
 Admiral Sir Edmund Nagle 
 George Napier
 Henry Napier
 General Sir William Napier
 Major General Luke O'Connor VC
 Major-General Sir Joseph O'Halloran
 Field Marshal James O'Hara
 Major General David The O'Morchoe
 Admiral Sir Robert Otway
 Admiral of the Fleet Sir Frederick Richards
 Admiral of the Fleet Sir John de Robeck
 Major General Robert Ross
 Admiral Sir Francis Tottenham
 Field Marshal George Wade
 Admiral Sir Peter Warren
 Field Marshal The Duke of Wellington
 Field Marshal Sir Henry Wilson MP
 Field Marshal Lord Wolseley

Others were not born in Ireland, but were born into Irish families, such as:-

 Field Marshal Lord French
 Field Marshal Lord Alanbrooke
 Field Marshal Lord Alexander of Tunis
 General Sir Miles Dempsey
 Brigadier General George Grogan VC
 Field Marshal Lord Gort VC
 General Sir Charles John Stanley Gough VC
 General Sir Hugh Henry Gough, VC
 General Sir John Hackett
 Field Marshal Lord Lambart
 Lieutenant General Sir George Macdonogh
 Admiral Sir Charles Madden
 Colonel Henry McMahon
 Field Marshal Lord Montgomery
 General Sir Richard O'Connor
 General Charles O'Hara
 Major-General Richard Pope-Hennessy
 General Sir Edward Quinan
 Field Marshal Lord Roberts

Victoria Cross recipients:-

The Victoria Cross, the British Crown's highest award for military valour, has been awarded to 188 persons who were born in Ireland or had full Irish parentage. Of these thirty were awarded in the Crimean War, 52 in the Indian Mutiny, and 46 in numerous other British Empire campaigns between 1857 and 1914. In the 20th century, 37 Irish VCs were awarded in the First World War, ten in the Second World War. One has been awarded in Afghanistan in the 21st century to a Belfast-born soldier of the Parachute Regiment.

'Irish' named units of the British Army 

 What is now the Royal Northumberland Fusiliers was founded in 1674 as "The Irish Regiment"
 The Volunteers of Ireland (1777–82), were renamed the 105th Regiment of Foot
 The Catholic Irish Brigade (1794-1798)
 4th Royal Irish Dragoon Guards, amalgamated 1922.
 5th Royal Irish Lancers, disbanded in 1921, reconstituted and amalgamated in 1922.
 6th (Inniskilling) Dragoons
 8th King's Royal Irish Hussars, amalgamated 1958.
 9th Queen's Royal Lancers, amalgamated with the 12th Royal Lancers to form the 9th/12th Royal Lancers in 1960.
 9th/12th Royal Lancers, amalgamated with the Queen's Royal Lancers to form the Royal Lancers, which includes the 5th Royal Irish Lancers, on 2 May 2015
 5th Royal Irish Lancers are represented in the new badge for the Royal Lancers regiment by the crossed lancers and the 'red' background colour in the regiment's tactical sign and shoulder patch
 Queen's Royal Irish Hussars, created 1958, amalgamated 1993.
 Queen's Royal Hussars (Queen's Own & Royal Irish). created 1993.
 the badge of the Queen's Royal Hussars includes an Irish harp as its centre-piece, representing the regiment's heritage from the 8th King's Royal Irish Hussars
 North Irish Horse
 South Irish Horse
 Irish Guards

 Royal Inniskilling Fusiliers, amalgamated 1968
 Royal Irish Fusiliers, amalgamated 1968
 Royal Ulster Rifles, amalgamated 1968
 Royal Irish Rifles, renamed as Royal Ulster Rifles 1921.
 Royal Irish Rangers, created 1968, amalgamated 1992
 Royal Irish Regiment
 Tyneside Irish Brigade, disbanded 1918.
 London Irish Rifles, amalgamated 1992
 Liverpool Irish.
 Royal Irish Artillery, amalgamated 1801.
 Ulster Defence Regiment, amalgamated 1992
 135th (Limerick) Regiment of Foot 1796 (highest regimental number of any British line regiment.)

'Irish' named 1922 disbanded units of the British Army 
Following the establishment of the independent Irish Free State in 1922, the six regiments that had their traditional recruiting grounds in the counties of the new state were all disbanded. On 12 June, five regimental Colours were laid up in a ceremony at St George's Hall, Windsor Castle, in the presence of HM King George V. (The South Irish Horse had sent a Regimental engraving because the regiment chose to have its standard remain in St. Patrick's Cathedral, Dublin). The six regiments finally disbanded on 31 July 1922 were:

 Royal Irish Regiment, disbanded 1922
 Connaught Rangers, disbanded 1922
 Leinster Regiment, disbanded 1922
 Royal Munster Fusiliers, disbanded 1922 
 Royal Dublin Fusiliers, disbanded 1922
 South Irish Horse, disbanded 1922

Many of the disbanded veterans were subsequently recruited into the Irish Free State's National Army at the onset of the Irish Civil War.

Canada 

The Irish Regiment of Canada in the Second World War was the only Canadian Irish unit to fight in any war. It also perpetuates the active service of the 1st Canadian Machine Gun Battalion from the First World War and the indirect service of the 190th (Sportsmen) Battalion, Canadian Expeditionary Force, and the 208th (Canadian Irish) Battalion, CEF.  Served as 1915 110th Irish Regiment; 1920 – The Irish Regiment; 1932 – The Irish Regiment of Canada; 1936 – The Irish Regiment of Canada (MG); 1940 – The Irish Regiment of Canada.

The Irish Fusiliers of Canada (Vancouver Regiment) perpetuated the First World War active service of the 29th (Vancouver) Battalion, CEF plus the indirect service of the 121st (Western Irish) Battalion, CEF and the 158th (Duke of Connaught's Own) Battalion, CEF.  Served as 1913 – 11th Regiment, Irish Fusiliers of Canada; 1920 – The Irish Fusiliers of Canada; 1936 – The Irish Fusiliers of Canada (Vancouver Regiment); 1946 – 65th Light Anti-Aircraft Regiment (Irish Fusiliers); 1958 – The Irish Fusiliers of Canada (Vancouver Regiment); 1965 – placed on the Supplementary Order of Battle; 2002 – amalgamated with The British Columbia Regiment.

The Irish Canadian Rangers perpetuated the indirect service of the 199th Battalion Duchess of Connaught's Own Irish Rangers, CEF.  Served as 1914 – 55th Irish Canadian Rangers; 1920 – The Irish Canadian Rangers; 1936 – disbanded.

The 218th (Edmonton Irish Guards) Battalion, CEF lacks perpetuation.  The colonel had Irish ancestry, but the largest group of its men were recent eastern European immigrants from the fringes of the Austro-Hungarian Empire who spoke Ukrainian but would have had Austrian citizenship.  This combined with the 211th (Alberta Americans) Battalion, CEF, to form the 8th Battalion, Canadian Railway Troops, which served in France building and maintaining railroads.

'Irish' named units of the Canadian Army 

 The Irish Canadian Rangers
 The Irish Fusiliers of Canada (The Vancouver Regiment)
 The Princess Louise Fusiliers. Although the word "Irish" does not appear in the unit name, the "PLF" are designated as an Irish regiment. The blue Caubeen is an authorized headdress, and a grey hackle (inherited from the Royal Inniskilling Fusiliers) is worn with it and with the beret.  Until relatively recently, officers also carried a blackthorn walking stick.
 The Irish Regiment of Canada
 121st (Western Irish) Battalion, CEF
 199th (Duchess of Connaught's Own Irish Rangers) Battalion, CEF
 208th (Canadian Irish) Battalion, CEF
 218th (Edmonton Irish Guards) Battalion, CEF

France
The Irish Brigade served the Ancien Régime from 1690 to 1792. 

Notable Irishmen who served in the French military include
 Patrice de Mac-Mahon, Duke of Magenta – General and President of the Third Republic
 Thomas Arthur, comte de Lally – General, commander in chief of the French Armies in India
 Myles Byrne ((1780-1862), Napoleon’s Irish Legion, retired under the Bourbon Restoration chef de bataillon.
 Arthur Dillon (1670–1733) – General
 Arthur Dillon (1750–1794) – General and Royalist, victim of the Reign of Terror in 1794. 
 Arthur Dillon (1834–1922)
 Henry Dillon – Colonel of the Dillon Regiment and apostate. 
 Théobald Dillon General, murdered by his own mutinous troops in 1792 cousin of Arthur Dillon
 Henri Jacques Guillaume Clarke – Marshal of France
 Henri D'Alton – General
 Arthur O'Connor - General of Division under Napoleon
 Charles Edward Jennings de Kilmaine
 Edward Stack – General
 Jean Louis Barthélemy O'Donnell - Comte O'Donnell

'Irish' named units of the French Army 
Kingdom of France
 Irish Brigade
 Régiment de Albemarle (1698–1703) (renamed Régiment de Fitzgerald)
 Régiment de Athlone
 Régiment de Berwick (1698–1775) (to Régiment de Clare)
2nd Battalion (1703–1715) (to 1st Battalion and Régiment de Roth)
 Régiment de Botagh
 Régiment de Bourke (1698–1715) (renamed Régiment de Wauchop)
 Régiment de Bulkeley
 Régiment de Butler (1689–1690)
 Régiment de Charlemont
 Régiment de Clare
 Régiment de Clancarty
 Régiment de Dillon (1698–1733) (renamed Régiment de Lee)
 Régiment de Dorrington (1698– ) (renamed Régiment de Roth)
 Régiment de Dublin
 Régiment de Feilding (1689–1690)
 Régiment de Fitzgerald (1703–1708) (renamed Régiment de O'Donnell)
 Régiment de Fitzgorman
 Régiment de Galmoy (1698–1715) (to Régiment de Dillon)
 Régiment de Lally
 Régiment de Lee (1733– )
 Régiment de Limerick
 Régiment de Mountcashel (1698– ) (renamed Régiment de Lee)
 Régiment de MacElligott
 Régiment de O'Brien
 Régiment de O'Donnell (1708–1715) (to Régiment de Clare)
 Régiment de Roscommon
 Régiment de Roth (or Rooth) (renamed Régiment de Walsh)
 Régiment de Walsh (renamed from Régiment de Roth)
 Régiment de Wauchop (1715) (to Spain)
 Fitzjame's Horse
 Galmoy's Horse
 Kilmallock's Dragoons
 O'Gara's Dragoons
 Nugent's Horse (renamed Fitzjames' Horse)
 Sheldon's Horse (1698– ) (renamed Nigent's Horse)

First French Empire
 Irish Legion (1803–1815)

Germany

Bavaria
During the War of the Spanish Succession Irishmen formed 8% of the Bavarian officer corps. The Elector of Bavaria, Maximilian, was also governor of Spanish Netherlands and nominated Irish officers to Walloon regiments.

Unified Germany
 Baron George Von Scheffler, Gardes du Corps (Prussia) 1914–18

In the First World War, Imperial Germany tried with the help of Roger Casement to recruit an "Irish Brigade" from Irish-born prisoners of war who had served in the British Army. By 1916 only 52 men had volunteered, and the plan was abandoned.

In the Second World War an even smaller number volunteered to join the Wehrmacht of Nazi Germany and were trained at Friesack Camp. Separately some IRA sympathisers planned certain operations with the Abwehr that were generally unsuccessful.

India

 Connaught Rangers, disbanded 1922
 Leinster Regiment, disbanded 1922
 Royal Dublin Fusiliers, disbanded 1922
 Royal Irish Fusiliers
 Royal Irish Regiment, disbanded 1922
 Royal Munster Fusiliers, disbanded 1922

Latin America

Events
 Spanish American wars of independence (1811–26)
 Irish and German Mercenary Soldiers' Revolt – Brazil 1828
 USA intervention in Mexico (1846–48)

People
 William Aylmer– Aide-de-camp to Mariano Montilla in Venezuela
 John Blossett- led the second British Legion to aid Simon Bolivar in the wars of independence against Spain.
 William Brown (admiral) – "Father of the Argentine Navy"
 Peter (Pedro) Campbell – Founder of the Uruguayan Navy (see Pedro Campbell  for detailed information.)
 John Deveroux – Commander of Irish Legion in Venezuela and New Granada.
 Antonio Donovan (1849–1897) – General in Argentina (text in Spanish)
 William Ferguson (1800–1828) – Aide-de-camp to General Simon Bolívar, involved in the struggle for independence of Venezuela, New Granada and Peru. On 28 September 1828 at Santafe de Bogotá, Ferguson was mistaken by conspirators for Bolívar, and shot in the back and mortally wounded while walking down the street. Honoured with a public funeral his remains were buried at the cathedral of Bogotá, an unusual honour for a Protestant.
 Che Guevara – Argentinian-Irish descent. Revolutionary in Cuba
 Rupert Hand – Cavalry colonel that assassinated general José María Córdova. Governor of El Choco (Colombia)
 Juan MacKenna – Founder of the Military Corps of Engineers of the Chilean Army.
 Juan Garland –  military engineer in the service of Spain and active in Chile.
 William Lamport – nicknamed El Zorro, The Fox, due to his exploits in Mexico
 Patrick Lynch  – Capitán de Milicias in Río de la Plata
 Estanislao Lynch – Argentine officer in the Army of the Andes
 Patricio Lynch – Admiral of the Chilean navy
 Joseph Mires- mathematician that founded the math Academy of Caracas (1808) as captain of the Regiment of the Queen, but soon turned to the cause of Venezuelan Patriots. As aid de camp of Marshal Antonio José de Sucre he will face battles, prison and exile until to be fired in Guayaquil, Ecuador, in 1829.
 Santiago Mariño Fitzgerald – Venezuelan born of an Irish mother descent, aide de camp to Simón Bolívar in Venezuela
 José Trinidad Morán- Venezuelan military man of an Irish father descent. Obtained Peruvian nationality for his services rendered in the war of independence. Participated in the liberation campaigns of Ecuador, Peru and Bolivia
 John Thomond O'Brien – Aide-de-camp to general José de San Martín.
 Jorge O'Brien – Captain of the Chilean Navy during the Chilean War of Independence.
 Francis O'Connor – officer in the Irish Legion of Simon Bolivar, Aide de camp to Antonio Jose de Sucre in Peru, Minister of War in Bolivia.
 Morgan O'Connell– Aide-de-camp to general Simon Bolivar in Venezuela
 Hugh O'Conor- Military governor of northern Mexico.
 Demetrio O'Daly (general) – Puerto Rican delegate to the Spanish Cortes
 Ambrosio O'Higgins – Colonial administrator and military governor of Chile (1788–1796), father of Bernardo O'Higgins
 Bernardo O'Higgins – First Chilean head of state (Supreme Director, 1817–23), commanded the forces that won independence from Spain.
 Daniel Florencio O'Leary – aide de camp to Simón Bolívar in Venezuela
 Alexander O'Reilly – General,  "Father of the Puerto Rican Militia"
 Robert Otway – Materially supported the Independence of Brazil
Robert Piggot – First irish commander of 1st Venezuelan Rifles of Bolivar Army  
 John Riley Comandante of the Saint Patrick's Battalion in the American-Mexican War
 James Rooke – at command of British Legions was seriously wounded in the Battle of Vargas Swamp (Colombia)
 Arthur Sandes –  Second irish commander of 1st Venezuelan Rifles of Bolivar Army
 James Towers English – Irish commander of British Legions forces in the Spanish American wars of independence.
 Pedro Dartnell – Descendant of irish, Commander-in-Chief of the Chilean Army. President of the Provisional Government Junta of 1925

'Irish' named units in Latin America 
 1st Regiment Venezuelan Rifles – Irish regiment that took part in the Venezuelan War of Independence.
 Saint Patrick's Battalion – Irish American battalion that deserted and fought for Mexico in the Mexican–American War

Papal States
The Irish that went to fight for the Papal States were not professional soldiers but an entirely voluntary force (a few were members of Cork Constabulary) that was raised with a sole purpose, to defend Pope Pius IX. By 1860 the ability of foreign countries to recruit in Ireland and Great Britain was frowned upon but still technically possible. It wouldn't be outlawed for another ten years with the Foreign Enlistment Act. Despite being promised that they would serve in a single brigade they were scattered among other brigades with men from other European Catholic countries. They were poorly clothed and equipped but fought with gallantry. The first battle they played a part in was Perugia where after most of the Papal force surrendered the Irish continued to fight. The next battle where the Irish fought was Spoleto. 300 Irish volunteers under Myles O'Reilly held off 2,500 veteran Piedmontese, including Victor Emmanuel's elite light infantry the Bersaglieri for fourteen hours including vicious hand-to-hand fighting. 
The next significant engagement was the Battle of Castelfidardo where 150 Irishmen fought. The war ended shortly after this when the outnumbered and out-equipped Papal army was ordered by Pius to lay down their arms. 
Apart from Myles O'Reilly this was the first military experience of Myles Keogh who later on fought with distinction during the US Civil War and after in the United States Cavalry until he fell at the Battle of Little Bighorn in 1876.

Portugal
Kingdom of Portugal
 Marshal William Beresford, 1st Viscount Beresford; head of the Portuguese army from 1809 to 1820.

Russia
The most recognised and outstanding Irishman to serve in the Russian Army was Peter Lacy from Bruff, County Limerick, who died in 1751 while governor of Livonia. Lacy's daughter married another Irish man from Limerick, General George Browne who became a Russian general and their son Johann Georg von Browne also rose to the rank of general in Russia. Count John O'Rourke was a prominent military theorist during the time of Catherine the Great. O'Rourke and his brother Cornelius joined the Russian Army. Cornelius married a niece of Lacy. John O'Rourke's son Joseph Cornelius O'Rourke rose to the rank of lieutenant general during the Napoleonic period.  Another prominent descendant Eduard Alexander Ladislaus Graf (Count) O'Rourke became the bishop of Gdańsk in the inter-war years and died an exile in Rome in 1943.
 
 Field Marshal Count Peter von Lacy

Sweden
Irish military involvement in the Swedish army was neither happy nor successful. At the beginning of the seventeenth century about 6,000 men were shipped out of Ulster for the security of the plantation and sent to Sweden. They were especially unhappy fighting for a Lutheran power. Some Irish friars disguised themselves as soldiers and moved among the men encouraging them to desert to Catholic powers. The men then left Swedish service and most joined the army of Poland. After this incident Gustavus Adolphus refused to accept any large scale recruitment of Irishmen considering them untrustworthy. However a small number went to serve in the officer corps. The most prominent of these was Hugh Hamilton, 1st Viscount of Glenawly. Two of his nephews also entered Swedish service.

South Africa 
Some Irish fought in British ranks in various colonial wars. Some Irish were also among the 1820 settlers, a famous example is the Rorke family whose descendants went on to set up Rorkes Drift. Battle of Rorkes Drift

Disbanded 'Irish' named units in South Africa 

 Cape Town Irish Volunteer Rifles
 Irish Boer commandos
 Irish Transvaal Brigade
 2nd Irish Brigade

'Irish' named units in South Africa 

 South African Irish Regiment Formed in 1914

Spain

The first major military exodus of Irishmen to Spain happened after the failure of the Second Desmond Rebellion in 1583. At least 200 Irish were part of the Armada in 1588. About the same time, in 1587, 600 Irishmen under the command of Sir William Stanley sent to aid the Dutch in their war with Spain switched sides with their commander and served Spain. 
The next great exodus of Irishmen to serve in the armies occurred after the Siege of Kinsale. An Irish regiment was formed in 1605 and Colonel Henry O'Neill was placed at its head. Five other Irish regiments were formed between 1632 and 1646 and were placed under the command of The Earl of Tyrconnell, Owen Roe O'Neill, Thomas Preston, Patrick FitzGerald and John Murphy. Later they were joined by Irishmen who had served in the army of Henri de Bourbon and Charles IV. The difficulties that plagued them at home were carried to the continent when O'Donnells refused to serve under O'Neills and tension existed between the Old English and the Old Irish. This was especially evident in tensions between O'Neill and Preston. 
After the Cromwellian conquest of Ireland there was a fresh exodus of men which suited the English as it ensured that men of fighting age would be engaged in wars on the continent. In one incident in 1653 during the Siege of Girona (Principality of Catalonia) some of the Irish defenders deserted and joined the French under de Bellefonds. With the restoration of Charles II in 1660 most of the remaining Irish chose to return to Ireland. Two regiments remained under the command of the O'Neills and Hugh Balldearg O'Donnell.
With the War of Succession in 1701 Irish regiments were reformed mostly via France. Two dragoon regiments were formed and named after their founders, O'Mahony (1703) and Crofton (1705). Four infantry regiments were formed between 1702 and 1718 while a fifth transferred from French service in 1715. They were named: 
Regimento de Infantería de Hibernia (1705– )
Regimento de Infantería de Irlanda (1702– )
Regimento de Infantería de Limerick (1718– )
Regimento de Infantería de Ultonia (Ulster) (1718– )
Regimento de Infantería de Wauchop (1715– )
Regimento de Infantería de Waterford (1718– )
There was a certain amount of reorganisation, so the Regimento de Infantería de Waterford became the second battalion of Irlanda in 1733. When Charles, Duke of Parma (future Charles II) became King of Naples and Sicily he took Regimento de Infantería de Limerick with him into Neapolitan service, where it was known as Regimento del Rey. The remaining regiments remained in Spanish service and wore red uniforms until 1802, when they changed to light blue in common with the remainder of the Spanish army.

 Donal Cam O'Sullivan Beare
 Hugh Dubh O'Neill
 Shane O'Neill (son of Hugh)
 Field Marshal Alejandro O'Reilly
 Juan O'Donojú
 Joaquín Blake y Joyes
 Ricardo Wall
 Leopoldo O'Donnell y Jorris
 Carlos Luis O'Donnell y Jorris
 Ambrosio O'Higgins
 Charles Wogan

Spanish Civil War (1936–1939)
 Frank Ryan
 Eoin O'Duffy
 Irish Brigade (Spanish Civil War)
 Irish Socialist Volunteers

United States

Irish have been fighting in the United States and British North America all the way back to the mid 1600s mostly in Virginia, Pennsylvania, and the Carolinas. Florence O’Sullivan a captain who was an early settler in South Carolina who was involved in much of the fighting against the Spanish and natives Sullivans Island. 
In the 1700s Irish surnames could be found on various colonial American records especially in Provincial military units that contained large amounts of troops born in Ireland even Washington's force at the battle of fort necessity the muster roll is found online. An example being frontiersman Samuel Brady. And earlier Thomas Dongan. Irish involvement only heightened with the American revolution and later in the mid 1800s when most of the Irish immigrants came to the United States.
Hercules Mooney
 Daniel Sullivan
Edward Hand
Thomas hickey
Jeremiah O’Brien 
Timothy Murphy (sniper) 
John Sullivan (general) revolutionary war general 
Richard Butler (general)
Stephen Watts Kearny
Thomas MacDonough
John Coffee
Presley Neville O’Bannon
 Michael Corcoran, General in the Union Army
 Thomas Francis Meagher
 Commodore John Barry "Father of the American Navy"
 Myles Walter Keogh
 Edward Stack
 Richard Montgomery
 Philip Sheridan
 James Shields (Brig. Gen. USA) Planned defeat of General Thomas "Stonewall" Jackson at Kernstown in 1862

Confederate States of America
 William M. Browne
 Patrick Cleburne
 Richard W. Dowling
 Joseph Finegan
 James Hagan (Confederate colonel)
 Walter P. Lane
 Patrick T. Moore
 John Mitchel

'Irish' named units in the United States
Many of these units have their origins from the participation of Irish-Americans in the American Civil War.

Incomplete

American Revolution

Loyalists
 Loyal Irish Volunteers
 2nd American Regiment (Volunteers of Ireland) later the 105th Regiment of Foot (British Army)
John Connolly

American Civil War

Union Army
69th Pennsylvania Infantry (formerly 2nd California) ("The Rock of Erin")
9th Connecticut Infantry
 7th Missouri Volunteer Infantry
 8th Missouri Volunteer Infantry
 9th Massachusetts Volunteer Infantry
 10th Ohio Volunteer Infantry
 10th Tennessee Volunteer Infantry (formerly 1st Middle Tennessee Volunteer Infantry)
 23rd Illinois Volunteer Infantry
 28th Massachusetts Infantry
 30th Missouri Volunteer Infantry
 35th Indiana Volunteer Infantry ("1st Irish")
 37th New York Volunteer Infantry ("The Irish Rifles")
 42nd New York Volunteer Infantry ("Tammany Jackson Guard")
 63rd New York Volunteer Infantry
 69th New York Volunteer Infantry ("Fighting 69th").  Currently an Army National Guard battalion that maintains Irish traditions
 88th New York Volunteer Infantry
 99th New York Volunteer Infantry
 116th Pennsylvania Volunteer Infantry
 164th New York Volunteer Infantry ("Corcoran's Irish Zouaves")
 Irish Brigade (US)

Confederate Army
 1st Irish Battalion, Virginia Infantry Regulars
 2nd Tennessee Volunteer Infantry ("Irish")
 6th Louisiana Volunteer Infantry ("Irish Brigade")
 9th Georgia Cavalry
 10th Tennessee Volunteer Infantry ("Sons of Erin")
 Louisiana Tigers
 Company E, 33rd Virginia Infantry, Stonewall Brigade ("Emerald Guards")
 McMillan Guards, Company K, 24th Georgia Infantry
 Jeff Davis Guard, Company F, 1st Texas Heavy Artillery
 Company I, 8th Alabama Volunteer Infantry ("Emerald Guards")
 Cobb's Legion (Georgia Legion)
Company D, 18th Arkansas Infantry Regiment, Marmaduke's ("The Shamrock Guards")

Modern era
 Admiral William M. Callaghan
 Michael Mullen, Chairman of the Joint Chiefs of Staff 2007-11
 Martin Dempsey, Chairman of the Joint Chiefs of Staff 2011-15

See also
 Flight of the Wild Geese
 Foreign enlistment in the American Civil War
 Loyalist (American Revolution)

Notes

Irish diaspora
American Civil War
American Revolutionary War
Confederate States Army soldiers
Expatriate military units and formations
 
 
Military history of the American Civil War
Social history of the American Civil War
 
Irish regiments of the British Army
Irish regiments of the United States Army
Irish regiments in European armies
Irish regiments in French service
War scare
Infantry